Hocus Pocus Hall was a gothic-themed house of mirrors at Chessington World of Adventures Resort in southwest London, England. Originally the site of several mansions dating back to 1348, Burnt Stub Mansion was a private feature for years, before opening as Hocus Pocus Hall in 2003. It closed in 2018 to be redeveloped as Room On The Broom: A Magical Journey.

History

Burnt Stub Mansion
The mansion at Chessington World of Adventures Resort, today called Burnt Stub was built in 1348 in Chessington. In the English Civil War it became a royalist stronghold, later being razed by Oliver Cromwell's Parliamentary forces giving it its modern name.

Hocus Pocus Hall description

Hocus Pocus Hall is a 4-D walk through attraction that leads throughout the mansion, with no age restriction. Theming includes animatronics such as a wizard and goblins, as well as rotating hallways and 3D paintings, for which 3-D glasses could be worn until the 2017 season where these were removed. The attraction would begin inside the main hall of the building where you were greeted by a preshow involving a wizard and the troublesome goblins of the Hall before the room transformed before your eyes into a room full of goblins and eyes from every corner - the bookcase would move aside leading you through a library corridor and into a trommel tunnel. After the tunnel you reach a generator room where goblins are causing all kinds of chaos in the form of animatronic statues and peppers ghost style projections. Guests throughout the scene are challenged to interact with buttons and pressure pads, even putting their hands in holes for a surprise or two. Guests were then led across pressure pads in what looked like a garden scene before reaching the “farting chair” - a chair which farted when someone was to sit on it. The next scene was the wizards bedroom where guests witnessed the goblins interacting around the sleeping wizard. The floors were then uneven as the attraction approached the finale, the mirror maze. The maze also included a drop off point for the 3D glasses until their removal. The mirror maze themed around a garden hid a few surprises as guests would get more and more lost whilst being surprised by goblins appearing through the glass. The attraction ends at the end of the mirror maze just to the right of the manors entrance.

During the park's 2013 Halloween event, the attraction had a makeover as “The Mystery of Hocus Pocus Hall”, featuring a new theme overlay and soundtrack.

It was announced in October 2018 that Hocus Pocus Hall would be redeveloped as Room On The Broom, based on the children's book by Julia Donaldson.

See also
Chessington World of Adventures Resort
House of mirrors

References

External links

2003 establishments in England
2018 disestablishments in England
Chessington World of Adventures past rides
Houses in the Royal Borough of Kingston upon Thames
Former buildings and structures in London
Mirrors